Raymond de Roon (born 1 September 1952 in Amsterdam) is a Dutch politician and former prosecutor. As a member of the Party for Freedom (Partij voor de Vrijheid) he has been an MP since 30 November 2006. He focuses on matters of foreign policy, military operations and the European Union.

In the 2006 general elections De Roon was third on the party list and in the 2010 general elections he was fourth.

Biography 
De Roon studied law at VU University Amsterdam and Leiden University. Afterwards, he was employed by the Dutch Ministry of Foreign Affairs. In 1983 he was deputy prosecutor in Leeuwarden. Later, he operated as a prosecutor in The Hague, the Netherlands Antilles, and Zutphen. His last job before his election to the House was as Advocate General at the Amsterdam court.

De Roon currently lives in Almere, and is also a member of the city council there. He was the local list puller for his party. The PVV went on to become the biggest party in Almere, with 21.6% of the vote and 9 seats in the council.

References 
  Parlement.com biography
  Geerts stille opportunisten (Gerectificeerd), de Volkskrant, 16 December 2006

External links 
  House of Representatives biography

1952 births
Living people
Dutch civil servants
Dutch prosecutors
Leiden University alumni
Members of the House of Representatives (Netherlands)
Party for Freedom politicians
Municipal councillors of Almere
Politicians from Amsterdam
21st-century Dutch politicians
20th-century Dutch people